Below are the mintage figures for the United States quarter.

The following mint marks indicate which mint the coin was made at (parentheses indicate a lack of a mint mark):

P = Philadelphia Mint

D = Denver Mint

S = San Francisco Mint

W = West Point Mint

O = New Orleans Mint

CC = Carson City Mint

Draped Bust quarter

Small eagle reverse

Heraldic eagle reverse

Capped Bust quarter

Large diameter

Small diameter

Seated Liberty quarter

No drapery

No motto, arrows, or rays (1840–1853)

Arrows and rays, no motto

Arrows, no rays or motto

No motto, arrows, or rays (1856–1865)

Motto, no arrows (1866–1873)

Motto and arrows

Motto, no arrows (1875–1891)

Barber quarter

Standing Liberty quarter

Type 1

Type 2

Type 3

Gold centennial issue

Washington quarter

See also 

 United States cent mintage figures
 Lincoln cent mintage figures
 United States nickel mintage figures
 Kennedy half dollar mintage figures

References 

Twenty-five-cent coins of the United States